Côte de Sézanne is one of the five sub-regions of the Champagne wine region.
It is south  of Vallée de la Marne, Champagne,  and Côte des Blancs.

References 

Champagne (wine)
Wine regions of France